Carl Andre (born September 16, 1935) is an American minimalist artist recognized for his ordered linear and grid format sculptures and for the suspected murder of contemporary artist and wife, Ana Mendieta. His sculptures range from large public artworks (such as Stone Field Sculpture, 1977 in Hartford, Connecticut and Lament for the Children, 1976 in Long Island City, New York), to large interior works exhibited on the floor (such as 144 Magnesium Square, 1969), to small intimate works (such as Satier: Zinc on Steel, 1989, and 7 Alnico Pole, 2011).

Andre married earth-body artist Ana Mendieta. In 1985, she fell from their apartment window and died after an argument with him. He was acquitted of a second-degree murder charge in a 1988 bench trial, but supporters of Mendieta have protested at his subsequent exhibitions.

Early life
Andre was born on September 16, 1935, in Quincy, Massachusetts. He completed primary and secondary schooling in the Quincy public school system and studied art at Phillips Academy in Andover, Massachusetts from 1951 to 1953. While at Phillips Academy, he became friends with Hollis Frampton, who would later influence Andre's radical approach to sculpture through their conversations about art and through introductions to other artists.

Andre served in the U.S. Army in North Carolina from 1955 to 1956, and moved to New York City in 1956. While in New York, Frampton introduced Andre to Constantin Brâncuși, through whom Andre became re-acquainted with a former classmate from Phillips Academy, Frank Stella, in 1958. Andre shared studio space with Stella from 1958 through 1960.

Work

Early work

Andre has cited Brâncuși as an inspiration for his early wood sculptures, but his conversations with Stella about space and form led him in a different direction. While sharing a studio with Stella, Andre developed a series of wooden "cut" sculptures (such as Radial Arm Saw cut sculpture, 1959, and Maple Spindle Exercise, 1959). Stella is noted as having said to Andre (regarding hunks of wood removed from Andre's sculpture), "Carl, that's sculpture, too."

From 1960 to 1964, Andre worked as a freight brakeman and conductor in New Jersey for the Pennsylvania Railroad. His experience with blue collar labor and the ordered nature of conducting freight trains would later influence Andre's sculpture and artistic personality. For example, it was not uncommon for Andre to dress in overalls and a blue work shirt, even to the most formal occasions."

During this period, Andre focused mainly on writing, and there is little notable sculpture of his on record between 1960 and 1965. The poetry would resurface later, most notably in a book published in 1980 by NYU Press called 12 Dialogues, in which Andre and Hollis Frampton took turns responding to one another at a typewriter using mainly poetry and free-form essay-like texts. Andre's concrete poetry has been exhibited in the United States and Europe, a comprehensive collection of which is in the collection of the Stedelijk Museum in Amsterdam.

Mature work
In 1965, Andre had his first public exhibition of his work in the Shape and Structure show curated by Henry Geldzahler at the Tibor de Nagy Gallery.

In the late 1960s, entrepreneur Karl Ströher from Darmstadt, Germany acquired three major works from Andre to give them on loan to the Hessisches Landesmuseum Darmstadt. Peter Iden then acquired these works for the Museum für Moderne Kunst Frankfurt in 1981. The works have since been shown in various "Change of Scene" exhibitions (1992–2002) at the museum in Frankfurt and internationally.

In 1969, Andre helped organize the Art Workers Coalition.

In 1970, he had a solo exhibition at the Solomon R. Guggenheim Museum.

Equivalent VIII

In 1972, Britain's Tate Gallery acquired Andre's Equivalent VIII, an arrangement of 120 firebricks.

The piece was exhibited several times without incident, but became the center of controversy in 1976 after being featured in an article in The Sunday Times and later being defaced with blue food dye.  The "Bricks controversy" became one of the most famous public debates in Britain about contemporary art.

Lever

Carl Andre's 'Lever' consists of a single line of 137 firebricks. The work concisely divides a space as the bricks hug the floor. The exhibition of Lever at the 1966 exhibition Primary Structures at the Jewish Museum in New York brought considerable recognition to Carl Andre.

Criticism

The gradual evolution of consensus about the meaning of Carl Andre's art was compiled in the book About Carl Andre: Critical Texts Since 1965, published by Ridinghouse in 2008. The most significant essays and exhibition reviews have been collated into this volume, including texts written by some of the most influential art historians and critics: Clement Greenberg, Donald Kuspit, Lucy R. Lippard, Robert C. Morgan, Barbara Rose and Roberta Smith.

Relationship with Ana Mendieta

In 1979, Andre met artist Ana Mendieta through a mutual friendship with artists Leon Golub and Nancy Spero at AIR Gallery in New York City. Andre and Mendieta married in 1985. Mendieta fell to her death from Andre's 34th story apartment window in 1985, after an argument with Andre. Their neighbors, a couple next door, are reported to have heard Mendieta scream "No" the same night, and Andre was also seen with multiple scratches on his face after that night. Andre is quoted from a 911 call after her death to have said, "What happened was we had … my wife is an artist and I am an artist and we had a quarrel about the fact that I was more, eh, exposed to the public than she was and she went to the bedroom and I went after her and she went out of the window...". The same night Andre was charged with second degree murder. He elected to be tried before a judge with no jury. In 1988, he was acquitted of all charges related to Mendieta's death. Andre remains a controversial figure, and museums who exhibit his work have been met with outrage from Mendieta's supporters. In 2017, protestors attended the opening of his exhibition at The Geffen Contemporary at MOCA in Los Angeles, distributing postcards that read “Carl Andre is at MOCA Geffen. ¿Dónde está Ana Mendieta?” (Spanish for "Where is Ana Mendieta?").

Artist books

Quincy, 1973: Artist book by Carl Andre which features commissioned photographs of landscapes and monuments in his hometown of Quincy, Massachusetts. Quincy was originally printed in conjunction with Andre's 1973 solo show at Addison Gallery, and reprinted by Primary Information in 2014.
America Drill, 2003, Les Maîtres de Forme Contemporains, mfc-michèle didier and Paula Cooper Gallery: Limited edition of 100 numbered, signed and stamped copies, 400 numbered copies and 100 artist's proofs.

References

Further reading

 About Carl Andre: Critical Texts Since 1965, 2008, published by Ridinghouse

Lauter, Rolf: Carl Andre: Extraneous Roots. Museum für Moderne Kunst in the Monastery of the Carmelites, Frankfurt am Main 07.06.-14.07.1991. 
Lauter, Rolf; Christian K. Scheffel; Carl Andre: Blickachsen 4, Skulpturen im Kurpark Bad Homburg v. d. Höhe, Bad Homburg 18.05.-05.10.2003. 
 Christel Sauer: Carl Andre: Cuts, DE/EN, Basel 2011, 
 Rider, Alistair. Carl Andre: Things in their Elements. London: Phaidon Press, 2011.

External links

Official Website
Filmed interview with Carl Andre – TateShots
Carl Andre collection MMK Frankfurt 
Carl Andre exhibition at Paula Cooper Gallery, NYC 2014
Retrospective Gets a Master’s Touch Carl Andre Emerges to Guide Installation at Dia:Beacon NEW YORK TIMES by Randy Kennedy
Carl Andre Dia Retrospective
Carl Andre – Biography and Analysis from the Art Story Foundation website
Short biography from the Guggenheim Museum
Carl Andre interviewed on PORT
Carl Andre Work & Extended Biography Timeline of Exhibitions 1964–present
Carl Andre at the Tate Modern
Brooklyn Rail In Conversation: Carl Andre with Michèle Gerber Klein and Phong Bui

1935 births
Living people
Minimalist artists
Sculptors from New York (state)
American contemporary artists
People from Quincy, Massachusetts
People acquitted of murder